The 16th FINA World Swimming Championships (25 m) took place from 13 to 18 December 2022 in Melbourne, Australia at the Melbourne Sports and Aquatic Centre. Swimming events in the championships were conducted in a 25-metre outdoor (short course) pool.

For the first time at a FINA World Swimming Championships (25 m), the 800 metre freestyle was contested for men and the 1500 metre freestyle for women, with qualification for competition determined based on times assessed per the FINA points system.

The Championships were originally scheduled for 17 to 22 December 2022 at the Palace of Water Sports in Kazan, Russia, and were relocated in response to the 2022 Russian invasion of Ukraine. All athletes and officials from Russia and Belarus were banned from the Championships by FINA.

Qualification
The qualification period for the 2022 World Swimming Championships ran from 24 July 2021 through 13 November 2022.

Below were the qualifying times as determined by FINA:

Schedule
An opening ceremony preceded the start of competition on 13 December and a closing ceremony concluded the Championships on 18 December following competition termination.

A total of 48 events were contested over six consecutive days.

Medal summary

Medal table

Results

Men's events

 Swimmers who participated in the heats only and received medals.

Women's events

 Swimmers who participated in the heats only and received medals.

Mixed events

 Swimmers who participated in the heats only and received medals.

Records set

World records

Championships records

Area records

World junior records

Participating nations
Swimmers from the following nations competed at the Championships.

Change of host and dates
Originally, the 2022 FINA World Swimming Championships (25 m) were scheduled to take place in Kazan, Russia at the Palace of Water Sports, with Kazan selected as the host location in July 2017. On 17 December 2020, the Russians were banned by the Court of Arbitration for Sport through 16 December 2022 from using their country name, anthem, and flag at any World Championships, potentially including this Championships to be held in their own country. In November 2021, over four years after the announcement of Kazan as host, the dates of competition, 17 to 22 December 2022, were announced.

Following escalating political tensions between Russia and Ukraine in late February 2022, FINA published a statement on 25 February 2022 in regards to holding competitions later in 2022, such as the 2022 World Swimming Championships, stating, "Other FINA events that are scheduled in Russia for later in the year are under close review, with FINA monitoring events in Ukraine very carefully."

On 26 February 2022, nine Nordic Swimming Federation members published a collaborative statement announcing that due to 2022 Russian invasion of Ukraine they will withdraw from competing at the Championships if it is hosted in Russia as a way of expressing support for Ukraine. Swimming federation presidents from the following national swimming federations signed the statement: Danish Swimming Union (Denmark), Estonian Swimming Federation (Estonia), Faroe Islands Swimming Association (Faroe Islands), Finnish Swimming Federation (Finland), Icelandic Swimming Association (Iceland), Latvian Swimming Federation (Latvia), Lithuanian Swimming Federation (Lithuania), Norwegian Swimming Federation (Norway), Swedish Swimming Federation (Sweden).

On 27 February 2022, Swimming Australia indicated they would not send athletes to the World Championships even if the location changed, publishing a statement saying they "made the decision to not send teams to any other events currently scheduled in Russia, including the FINA World Short Course Championships in December." Two days later, British Swimming followed suit, stating, "British Swimming supports a ban on Russia and Belarus from all aquatics competition, and confirms that it will be withdrawing from all events currently due to take place in Russia or Belarus, including the 2022 FINA World Short Course Championships and the 2024 European Championships, both scheduled for Kazan, Russia." The same day, Swimming Canada also published a statement withdrawing its athletes, stating, "Due to the acts of aggression being perpetrated by Russia against Ukraine, Swimming Canada will not send a team to the 2022 FINA World Swimming Championships (25m), scheduled for Kazan, Russia, this December."

On 28 February 2022, the International Olympic Committee published a statement pushing for the ban of Russian and Belarusian athletes and officials in international sporting competitions, stating, "In order to protect the integrity of global sports competitions and for the safety of all the participants, the IOC EB recommends that International Sports Federations and sports event organisers not invite or allow the participation of Russian and Belarusian athletes and officials in international competitions."

On 1 March 2022, FINA published a statement regarding athlete participation in FINA competitions stating, "Until further notice, no athlete or Aquatics official from Russia or Belarus be allowed to take part under the name of Russia or Belarus. Russian or Belarusian nationals, be it as individuals or teams, should be accepted only as neutral athletes or neutral teams. No national symbols, colours, flags should be displayed or anthems should be played, in international Aquatics events which are not already part of the respective World Anti-Doping Agency (WADA) sanctions for Russia."

On 23 March 2022, FINA announced the Russian Swimming Federation had pulled all of its athletes from competing in FINA events for the remainder of the 2022 year, including the 2022 World Swimming Championships, and withdrew the event from its originally scheduled host location at the Palace of Water Sports in Kazan, Russia. Almost one month later, in mid-April, FINA decided to exclude all Russian and Belarusian officials and athletes from the Championships.

On 20 May 2022, FINA announced the Championships would officially be transplanted to new host Melbourne, Australia with the dates of competition from 13 to 18 December 2022 and the Melbourne Sports and Aquatic Centre serving as the new venue for the Championships.

See also
 List of swimming competitions
 FINA World Swimming Championships (25 m)
 2022 in sports

References

External links
 Results
 Results book

2022 FINA World Swimming Championships (25 m)
FINA World Swimming Championships (25 m)
FINA
FINA
Sports competitions in Melbourne
International aquatics competitions hosted by Australia
FINA
Sports events affected by the 2022 Russian invasion of Ukraine